Şamlı Wind Farm is an onshore wind power plant in Şamlı in Balıkesir Province in western Turkey.

The wind farm consists of three fields operated by different companies. A total of 91 wind turbines have an installed output power of 150 MW and generate about 375 GWh a year.

Technical details
 Field 1 consists of 38 turbines of type Vestas V90/3000 each with  rotor diameter at a hub height of   generating 3.0 MW power. Total installed power increased from  90 MW to 114 MW with the expansion completed in November 2011. Operated by Borasco.
 Field 2 has a total installed power is 30.0 MW. Operated by Yapısan company.
 Field 3 consists of 20 turbines of type Vestas. Total installed power is 30.0 MW. The field is operated by Bares company.

References 

Buildings and structures in Balıkesir Province
Wind farms in Turkey